The Men's 800 metres event  at the 2011 European Athletics Indoor Championships was held at March 4–6 with the final being held on March 6 at 15:45 local time.

Records

Results

Heats
First 2 in each heat and 2 best performers advanced to the Semifinals. The heats were held at 16:55.

Semifinals 
First 3 in each heat advanced to the Final. The heats were held at 15:40.

Final 

The final was held at 15:45.

References 

800 metres at the European Athletics Indoor Championships
2011 European Athletics Indoor Championships